Friendship, Wisconsin is the name of two unrelated places:

 Friendship (town), Wisconsin, Fond du Lac County
 Friendship (village), Wisconsin, Adams County